Siège social (French, usually translated Head Office) is a concept in international law for determining the nationality of companies. It is essentially based on effective nationality as opposed to “paper nationality”. The paper nationality is where the company has been incorporated, but the effective nationality requires a genuine link to the corporate activity. It describes the nationality based on the location of the actual activity of the corporation through where the owners are or the actual business is done.

According to the criterion of siège social, siège réel or siege réel social, a company's nationality derives from “the place where the legal entity's judicial and economic integration is situated”, or in other words the company's principal place of establishment.

See also
 Seat (legal entity)

References 

International law